GNS Healthcare is a biosimulation company based in Somerville, MA.  

A company called Gene Network Sciences (GNS) had been founded in 2000 by Cornell physicists Colin Hill and Iya Khalil, which focused on computational biology models of interactions among genes and proteins in cells, with a focus on cancer drug discovery.

GNS Healthcare was formed as a subsidiary GNS in 2010 to apply the data analytic methods the company had developed to the healthcare provider, health insurance, pharmacy benefit management and health informatics industries.

References

Further reading
 Kolakowski, Nick (September 26, 2012) "GNS Healthcare, Aetna Team on Analytics to Combat Metabolic Syndrome". "Slashdot".
 Cambia Health Solutions (April 18, 2012) "Cambia Health Solutions Announces Investment in GNS Healthcare". (Press release).
 Miller, Katherine (January 2, 2012) "Big Data Analytics In Biomedical Research". Biomedical Computation Review.
 Council on Competitiveness (June 30, 2011) "Council on Competitiveness Showcases Power of High Performance Computing in Case Study with GNS Healthcare" (Press release).

External links 
 

Health care companies based in New York (state)